Abu Ali Muhammad ibn Muhammad al-Jayhani (died 942) was a vizier of the Samanid dynasty.

Life
He was a member of the Jayhani family, that provided several officials to the Samanids. As the sources generally refer to these individuals only by their kunya and nisbah, separating the lives and identities of the family members is difficult. Abu Ali was apparently the son of Abu Abdallah Muhammad ibn Ahmad al-Jayhani, who served as vizier to Emir Nasr II in 914–922. 

Abu Ali himself served as vizier to Nasr II in 937/8 until 941/2 or slightly before that. Like his master, Abu Ali converted to Isma'ilism at that time. He died in AH 330 (941/2 CE), and was succeeded by a fervent Isma'ili partisan, Abu al-Tayyib al-Mus'abi. It may be, however, that al-Mus'abi had already succeeded Abu Ali before the latter's death. According to some sources, Abu Ali patronized the Shi'a gnostic al-Kayyal.

Abu Ali's son, Abu Abdallah, also served as vizier in 975/6–977.

References

Sources
  
 
 

942 deaths
Samanid viziers
10th-century Ismailis
Converts to Shia Islam